Revenger (stylized in all caps) is a 2023 Japanese original anime television series animated by Ajia-do Animation Works and produced by Nitroplus and Shochiku. Set i Japan, the series follows a samurai named Raizo Kurima who crossses paths with hitmen known as Revengers after being betrayed by his superiors. It is set for run for twelve episodes.

Premise
Raizo Kurima is a hitman working for the organization Revengers, which takes revenge on behalf those who have no power. The group works at the "Ribenjiya" store that acts as a general store on the outside, while hiding the Revengers organization beneath the surface. Kurima's coworkers include a physician with destructive impulses, a beautiful and androgynous young man who is both cruel and innocent, a gambler who loves money and alcohol, and an intelligent lacquer craftsman. The five men start to build a strange friendship through working together.

Characters

The main protagonist, a master swordsman whose loyalty to his clan was used to manipulate him into murdering his own fiancée's father. He soon kills the man who arranged the plot, and with nowhere to go after his fiancée kills herself in despair, joins the Ribenjiya crew who helped him.

A soft-spoken handyman whose day job is as a maki-e lacquerware artist. However, he secretly runs Ribenjiya, a gairaigo corruption of the word "revenge," to help settle the blood debts of those who normally cannot afford to hire a hitman. His preferred method of killing is slapping a sheet of gold lacquer over the target's face until they suffocate. Yuen has a large tattoo of the Virgin Mary covering his back, signifying his faith and his work for an underground Christian group.

A former pirate and current doctor who treats patients from all walks of life, regardless of their ability to pay. He creates and maintains a secret stash of weapons for Ribenjiya, and his massive frame allows him to use heavier weaponry than most people can not use.

A small, androgynous boy whose angelic face hides a cruel and calculating mind. His favorite method of assassination involves using kite strings covered in tiny glass shards.

A self-indulgent gambler who prizes money, alcohol, and women above all else. However, he is surprisingly compassionate when dealing with people he likes. His favorite weapon is a deck of hanafuda cards with thin iron pieces embedded in them, which he throws at enemies' vital points.

An underground Christian priest who preaches out of a half-destroyed chapel in Nagasaki, he gives spiritual guidance and funding to the members of Ribenjiya.

A government official from the Nagasaki Magistrate's office who takes credit for cracking down on the opium trade within the region, and is known for cavorting with many prostitutes around town. He is quietly manipulating Ribenjiya for his own ends.

Leader of the Nagasaki Trade Union who seems connected to the local opium trade.

Chinese gang leader attempting to root out the source of the opium in Nagasaki before it spreads into his country. An extremely skilled martial artist who can even take on Raizo bare-handed.

A wandering priest who secretly runs a rival "Ribenjiya" group, and has fewer qualms about accepting jobs.

Production
The anime is directed by Masaya Fujimori and written by Gen Urobuchi of Nitroplus and Renji Ōki, with Jun Futamata composing the music. Jiro Suzuki and Yuushi provided the original character designs, and Yuji Hosogoe is adapting the designs for animation while also serving as chief animation director along with Yuki Nishioka and Emiko Endo. It premiered on January 5, 2023, on Tokyo MX and other channels. Crunchyroll licensed the series. However, the English dub of episode 3 was delayed due to inclement weather delays in the Dallas area where the series is dubbed.

The series is meant show both Western and Eastern culture according to Fujimori, while the style is meant to give the idea of "cool". Urobuchi wrote it with the hope it will properly appeal the audience based on the several concepts he came across. Since getting involved in the project, Urobuchi believed something really good came out. He expressed his interest in the characters' inner thoughts as well as the traditional animaton used to properly portrays the clothing like kimono. While silent about it, Urobuchi claims Revenger will use tricky plottwists and also rely on clever strategies. With that in mind, the title of the work also does not contain any hidden meanings. Urobuchi believes Revenger will make an impact, on those who are waiting for a "truly interesting" work.

Based on Urobuchi's comments, Fujimori finds the script is very rich and intriguing so Fujimori finds working on the storyboards to be unbelievably fun. Speaking from Fujimori's own experience with media from his early days, he is trying to recreate the experience of watching period dramas and criminal dramas that aired during the Showa era and update the experience for the present time. Because of looser regulations, New Cinema and macaroni western programs that aired on television back then were full of surprises, and audiences did not know what would happen next. Revenger is well-supported by animation, finishing, background art, and photography. Doing a period drama is very difficult, so he had to bow his head at the work done. The cool and restrained sound production makes the film more mature.

RetBear said that "Downtimer" emphasizes the determination of moving forward despite not being able to properly see the future which fits with the series' ideals of revenge. Sakamoto gives her own perspectives. Sakamoto asked Yūho Iwasato, the lyricist she respects the most, to write the lyrics with the image of wanting to create a song that would envelop and purify the hearts of the characters. Sakamoto was happy that animators created an ending sequence that is calm and gentle to match the song.

Release

Episode list

Home media

Other media
A manga adaptation by Ryūsei Yamada began serialization in Square Enix's Monthly GFantasy magazine on January 18, 2023.

Reception
Anime Feminist and Anime News Network reviewed the series' premiere with both noting it uses several tropes which Gen Urobuchi is known for. While the setting was found interesting for mixing Oriental and Occidental content in a hystorical Japan, the lack of female characters was criticized especially due to the suicide of Kurima's fiancee at the end of first episode. Nevertheless, the character designs and animation were praised, fitting especially for the action scene.

References

External links
 

2023 anime television series debuts
Action anime and manga
Ajia-do Animation Works
Anime and manga about revenge
Anime with original screenplays
Bandai Namco franchises
Crunchyroll anime
Gangan Comics manga
Historical anime and manga
Nitroplus
Samurai in anime and manga
Shochiku
Shōnen manga
Tokyo MX original programming